Yairo is a given name. Notable people with the name include:

Yairo Moreno (born 1995), Colombian footballer
Yairo Muñoz (born 1995), Dominican baseball player
Yairo Yau (born 1989), Panamanian footballer

See also
Nairo
Yairo Station